The 2018 Asian Men's Club Volleyball Championship was the 19th edition of the Asian Men's Club Volleyball Championship, an annual international volleyball club tournament organised by the Asian Volleyball Confederation (AVC) with Myanmar Volleyball Federation (MVF). The tournament was held in Naypyidaw, Myanmar from 30 July to 6 August 2018. The champions qualified for the 2018 FIVB Volleyball Men's Club World Championship instead of the 2017 champions Sarmayeh Bank Tehran, who withdrew from the 2018 Club World Championship.

Qualification
The 13 AVC member associations submitted their men's club to the 2018 Asian Club Championship. The 13 AVC member associations were from 4 zonal associations, including, Central Asia (5 teams), East Asia (4 teams), Oceania (1 team) and Southeast Asia (3 teams).

Qualified teams
The following teams qualified for the tournament.

Pools composition
This was the first Asian Club Championship which used the new competition format. Following the 2017 AVC Board of Administration's unanimous decision, the new format saw teams were drawn into four pools up to the total amount of the participating teams. Each team as well as the hosts was assigned into a pool according to their final standing of the 2017 edition. As the three best ranked teams were drawn in the same pool A, the next best three contested pool B, the next best four contested pool C. Final standing of the 2017 edition are shown in brackets.

Venues
 Wunna Theikdi Sports Complex – Hall B, Naypyidaw, Myanmar
 Wunna Theikdi Sports Complex – Hall C, Naypyidaw, Myanmar

Pool standing procedure
 Number of matches won
 Match points
 Sets ratio
 Points ratio
 If the tie continues as per the point ratio between two teams, the priority will be given to the team which won the last match between them. When the tie in points ratio is between three or more teams, a new classification of these teams in the terms of points 1, 2 and 3 will be made taking into consideration only the matches in which they were opposed to each other.

Match won 3–0 or 3–1: 3 match points for the winner, 0 match points for the loser
Match won 3–2: 2 match points for the winner, 1 match point for the loser

Preliminary round
All times are Myanmar Standard Time (UTC+06:30).

Pool A

|}

|}

Pool B

|}

|}

Pool C

|}

|}

Pool D

|}

|}

Final round
All times are Myanmar Standard Time (UTC+06:30).

Playoffs

|}

Quarterfinals

|}

9th–12th semifinal

|}

5th–8th semifinals

|}

Semifinals

|}

13th place match

|}

11th place match

|}

9th place match

|}

7th place match

|}

5th place match

|}

3rd place match

|}

Final

|}

Final standing

Awards

Most Valuable Player
 Hamzeh Zarini (Khatam Ardakan)
Best Setter
 Roman Khandrolin (Atyrau)
Best Outside Spikers
 Hossein Amiri (Khatam Ardakan)
 Aibat Netalin (Atyrau)

Best Middle Blockers
 Adel Gholami (Khatam Ardakan)
 Nguyễn Dinh Nhu (Sanest Khánh Hòa)
Best Opposite Spiker
 Aimal Khan (Wapda)
Best Libero
 Mojtaba Yousefi (Khatam Ardakan)

See also
2018 Asian Women's Club Volleyball Championship

References

External links
Official website
Squads

International volleyball competitions hosted by Myanmar
Asian Club Volleyball Championship
Asian Club Volleyball Championship
V
V